Sułkowo may refer to:

Sułkowo, Kuyavian-Pomeranian Voivodeship (north-central Poland)
Sułkowo, Choszczno County in West Pomeranian Voivodeship (north-west Poland)
Sułkowo, Łobez County in West Pomeranian Voivodeship (north-west Poland)
Sułkowo, Stargard County in West Pomeranian Voivodeship (north-west Poland)